Quin is a village in southeast County Clare, Ireland. The name also refers to a civil parish in the barony of Bunratty Upper, and to an ecclesiastical parish of the same name. The main attraction in the vicinity is Quin Abbey, the ruins of Franciscan friary, which is open to the public. Although roofless, much of the structure remains and is relatively well-preserved. The abbey was built on the foundations of an earlier Norman castle; the foundations of three corner towers can still be seen.

The village is located in the townland sometimes known as Plassey.

Location
There was a productive lead mine at Ballyhickey, from which ore was taken to Clarecastle for shipment to Wales.

The Catholic parish of Quin is in the Roman Catholic Diocese of Killaloe. The churches in the parish are Blessed John XXIII in Clooney, St. Mary's in Quin, and St. Stephen's in Maghera.

The civil parish of Quin is in the Bunratty Upper barony. The civil parish held 7,290 statute acres in 1837, as applotted under the Tithe Act. The townlands in the Quin civil parish are:

 Applefort
 Ballagh
 Ballyhannan North
 Ballyhannan South
 Ballyhickey
 Ballykilty (also known as Plassey)
 Ballymacloon East
 Ballymacloon North
 Ballymacloon West
 Ballymarkahan
 Ballyroughan North
 Ballyroughan South
 Cahercalla
 Cant
 Carnmallow
 Carrowgar
 Carrowmeer
 Carrowroe
 Cloonaherna
 Coogaun
 Coolshamroge
 Commons
 Cragbwee
 Craggataska
 Craggaunowen
 Creevagh Beg
 Creevagh More
 Cullenagh
 Cullaun
 Cutteen
 Dangan
 Danganbrack
 Deerpark North
 Deerpark South
 Feaghquin
 Gorteen
 Keevagh
 Kildrum
 Kilnacrandy
 Knocknagoug
 Knappogue
 Madara
 Quin
 Quingardens
 Quinville North
 Quinville South
 Rathluby
 Rine
 Rinneen
 Shandangan

History

Some of the most important prehistoric gold works in Ireland were found in Quin.

An earlier abbey was founded in Quin around 1250, but burned down in 1278. In 1280, Thomas de Clare built a Norman castle on the same site, which later fell into ruin. During the time of this castle, Quin is first mentioned as a village. 

The castle ruins were later rebuilt as a church and Quin Abbey (1433). Quin Abbey is considered to be one of the finest and most complete remains of monastic antiquity in Ireland. The abbey housed many Franciscan friars until the death of the last monk, Father Hogan, in 1820. His burial site can be visited in the abbey.  

News of the Irish Rebellion of 1641 was first announced in County Clare "at the great fair of Quin".

In 1837, the parish had a small plain church of the Church of Ireland, built in 1797. At the time, a new Catholic chapel in Gothic style was being built.

Demographics
As of 1831, there were 2,918 inhabitants, of whom 173 lived in the village. According to a 2002 Census, Quin had a population of 853. By 2006, the population had grown to around 1,048. In the 2016 Census, the village population was 951.

Sport
Clooney Quin GAA was founded in 1888. Players for the Clooney/Quin club include Amby Power, who captained the Clare 1914 All-Ireland winning team.

Notable people
 Ger Colleran, former editor of the Irish Daily Star, grew up in Quin
 Paddy Hannan born in 1840, started the then world's biggest gold rush in 1893 in Kalgoorlie
 Amby Power (hurler) born in 1887 in Quin
 Arthur Quinlan (journalist) was reared in Quin

See also
 List of towns and villages in Ireland

References

External links

 Clare Library - Quin
 Cloony-Quin GAA

Towns and villages in County Clare
Parishes of the Roman Catholic Diocese of Killaloe